Rod Jones (born 5 February 1953) is an Australian novelist. He was writer in residence at La Trobe University for four years, and has also been the Australia Council's writer in residence in Paris. He studied English and History at the University of Melbourne.

Writing
Rod Jones’ first novel, Julia Paradise, won the Fiction Award in the South Australian Premier's Awards in 1988, was shortlisted for the Miles Franklin Literary Award and was runner-up for the Femina Etranger Prize in Paris. It has been translated into ten languages and published throughout the world, most recently as a 2013 Text Classic, with an introduction by Emily Maguire. Julia Paradise was described by the New York Times as "... utterly original ... a remarkable accomplishment".

His second novel, Prince of the Lilies, interweaves Minoan archaeology and life in contemporary Greece.

Billy Sunday, Jones's third novel, was winner of the 1995 Age Book of the Year Award for Fiction and the 1996 National Book Council Banjo Award for Fiction. The Boston Globe called Billy Sunday, 'The Great American Novel'.

His fourth novel, Nightpictures, was shortlisted for the 1998 Miles Franklin Award and published in France under the title Images de la Nuit(Albin Michel).

Jones's fifth novel, Swan Bay (Actes Sud), is published in France under the title La Baie des Cygnes.

Rod Jones' most recent work is the semi-autobiographical novel The Mothers, released by Text Publishing in 2015. Alex Miller observed, "Rod Jones' The Mothers is beautifully written and deeply poignant. One of the most satisfying Australian novels I’ve read in years", and Toni Jordan said "I was captivated by the humanity and heart of the characters. Rod Jones has created a vivid and compelling world and I cared about everyone in it."

Works
 Julia Paradise (1986)
 Prince of the Lilies (1991)
 Billy Sunday (1995)
 Nightpictures (1997)
 Swan Bay: A novel of destiny, desire and death (2003)
 The Mothers (2015)

Notes

References
Sullivan, Jane (2003) "An act of devotion" in theage.com.au Accessed: 2007-09-02

1953 births
20th-century Australian novelists
21st-century Australian novelists
Australian male novelists
Living people
University of Melbourne alumni
20th-century Australian male writers
21st-century Australian male writers